Majid Ariff (2 June 1937 – 4 February 2018) was a Singaporean football striker and coach. Majid, widely believed to be the finest footballer Singapore has produced and the only one to have played for the AFC Asian All Stars team in 1966, died of pneumonia, aged 80, on 4 February 2018.

Majid's most prominent protege is Fandi Ahmad. They were the only Singaporeans among 116 top Asian players to be nominated for Asia's Footballer of the Century award in 1998.

References 

1937 births
2018 deaths
Singaporean footballers
Deaths from pneumonia in Singapore
Association football forwards
Singapore international footballers